= Camppro Football Club =

CAMPpro FOOTBALL CLUB
- PRESIDENT: Godfrey John Okoh
- Head Coach: Sunday Okoh

CAMPpro Football Club (commonly known as CAMPpro FC) is a Nigerian football club and youth development academy based in Abuja, Nigeria. The club was founded in 2019 by Godfrey John Okoh and focuses on grassroots football development, talent identification, and player progression into professional football.

Camppro FC has gained recognition for developing young players who have progressed to clubs in the Nigeria Premier Football League (NPFL) and other professional leagues.

== History ==
Camppro Football Club was established in 2019 with the objective of providing structured football development pathways for young players in Nigeria. Founded by Godfrey John Okoh, the club began as a grassroots initiative aimed at nurturing talent through organised training, competitions, and exposure programs.

Within a few years of its establishment, Camppro FC became actively involved in Nigeria's lower-tier football competitions, particularly the Nationwide League One (NLO), where it competed against emerging clubs across the country.

== Player development and transfers ==
The club is known for its emphasis on player development and has recorded several successful player transitions into top-tier Nigerian football.

In 2025, Camppro FC completed a landmark transfer deal involving three players moving to clubs in the Nigeria Premier Football League. This development marked a significant milestone in the club's history and highlighted its growing reputation as a talent pipeline.

One of the club's notable products, Jofrank Istifanus, secured a move to Nasarawa United F.C., where he gained recognition, including being named in a monthly best XI in the NPFL.

== Competitions ==
Camppro FC has participated in the Nationwide League One, which represents the third tier of Nigerian football. The club has competed in regional conferences and playoff tournaments organised by the league.

The team has also been involved in promotion playoffs for advancement to the Nigeria National League (NNL).

== Notable players ==
Camppro FC has developed several players who have gone on to play in Nigeria's top flight and other professional leagues:

- Godfrey Joseph – Attacking midfielder; plays for Niger Tornadoes F.C.
- Joshua Omobolaji Ayanlola – Central defender; plays for Kun Khalifat FC
- Ismaila Isah Ataboh – Central defender; plays for FC Arta
- Ekesi Cornelius Ebuka – Central defender; contracted to Nasarawa United F.C., on loan at Basira FC
- Stephen Gyang Pam – Forward; plays for Ranchers Bees F.C.
- Lordson Ter’ade Ichuul – Defensive midfielder; plays for Basira FC; previously featured for Enyimba F.C., Lobi Stars F.C. and AC Kajaani
- Jofrank Istifanus – Forward; plays for Nasarawa United F.C.
